Charles Philip Stourton, 17th Baron Stourton (1752–1816) was the son of William Stourton and Winifred Howard, a great-granddaughter of the 6th Duke of Norfolk and a leading Roman Catholic.

The seventeenth Baron succeeded his father in 1781, and was succeeded by his son William Joseph in 1816. On 12 July 1775, Charles married Mary Langdale, a daughter of Marmaduke, 5th Baron Langdale and his wife, Constantia Smythe, a sister of Walter Smythe and therefore an aunt of Maria Anne Smythe, who, following her second marriage became known as Mrs. Fitzherbert.

Charles inherited Roundhay Park in Leeds, from his father, whose father, Captain the Hon. Charles Stourton, son of William Stourton, XII Baron Stourton, had acquired the estate by marriage and inheritance but sold it in 1803 before acquiring the Allerton Mauleverer estate in Yorkshire.

They had eight children, including William Stourton, 18th Baron Stourton and Sir Edward Marmaduke Joseph Vavasour, 1st Baronet Vavasour of Hazelwood.

Their third son, Charles, became one of the first Roman Catholics in the House of Commons and was a leading Roman Catholic layman in the 19th century.

Notes

References
 Kidd, Charles and Williamson, David (editors). Debrett's Peerage and Baronetage (1995 edition). London: St. Martin's Press, 1995, 

1752 births
1816 deaths
17
18th-century English people
19th-century English people